Bir İstanbul Masalı is a Turkish TV series.

Cast and characters

Link 
 Bir İstanbul Masalı on IMDb

Turkish drama television series
2003 Turkish television series debuts
2005 Turkish television series endings
2000s Turkish television series
ATV (Turkey) original programming